Abramo is a given name. Notable people with the name include:

Abramo Albini (botn 1948), Italian rower
Abramo Basevi (1818–1885), Italian musicologist and composer
Abramo Canka (born 2002), Italian basketball player
Abramo dall'Arpa (died 1566), Italian harpist 
Abramo Bartolommeo Massalongo (1824–1860), Italian paleobotanist and lichenologist

See also
Abramo (surname)